William Spicer may refer to:

William Spicer (14th-century MP), MP for Devizes
William A. Spicer (1865–1952), Seventh-day Adventist minister and president of the General Conference of Seventh-day Adventists
William C. Spicer (1868–?), American college football player and coach
William E. Spicer (1929–2004), American engineering academic 
William L. Spicer (1918–1991), American businessman and state chairman of the Arkansas Republican Party
William Spicer (cricketer) (1846–1892), English cricketer
William Spicer (Medal of Honor) (1864–1949), gunner's mate in the United States Navy who received the Medal of Honor
William Spicer (MP for Exeter) (c. 1735–1788), British MP for Exeter, 1767–1768